Caquinte (Caquinte Campa), also Poyenisati, is an Arawakan language of Peru. It is spoken along the Poyeni, Mayapo, Picha, Yori, and Agueni rivers, with some speakers along parts of the Sensa and Vitiricaya rivers, within Junín, Peru. It is an endangered language.

Caquinte people are a division of the Campa Indians. They mostly live outside the "regional cash economy". They raise manioc as protein staple, being a subsistence agricultural community. Their population approximates 1000 people, with "sporadic" outside contact.

References

External links 
ELAR collection: An Audiovisual Corpus of Caquinte (Arawak) deposited by Zachary O'Hagan

Languages of Peru
Campa languages